Yulu is an ethnic group in Central African Republic, 
Democratic Republic of the Congo, Sudan and South Sudan. They speak Yulu, a Nilo-Saharan language. The population of this group is at several thousand.

References

Ethnologue entry

Ethnic groups in South Sudan
Ethnic groups in Sudan
Ethnic groups in the Central African Republic
Ethnic groups in the Democratic Republic of the Congo